This is a list of the birds of Heard Island and the adjacent McDonald Islands in the southern Indian Ocean. For other animals there, see List of non-avian fauna of Heard Island and McDonald Islands.

The avifauna of Antarctica include a total of 47 species, of which 1 is endemic. This list's taxonomic treatment (designation and sequence of orders, families and species) and nomenclature (common and scientific names) follow the conventions of The Clements Checklist of Birds of the World, 2022 edition. The family accounts at the beginning of each heading reflect this taxonomy, as do the species counts found in each family account.

The birds of Heard Island and McDonald Islands, a subantarctic Australian territory between Australia, Africa and Antarctica, are, whether breeders or visitors, almost all seabirds which find their food at sea in the waters of the surrounding Southern Ocean.  An exception is the black-faced sheathbill, an opportunistic scavenger around seal and penguin colonies and the only solely terrestrial breeding bird species present on the islands. The southern giant-petrel and Subantarctic skua are also scavengers as well as predators at seabird colonies.

Heard Island is an important breeding site for macaroni, eastern rockhopper, gentoo and king penguins.  Endemic species or subspecies are the Heard shag and the black-faced sheathbill. The surrounding waters are home to numerous species of albatross and petrel, some of which breed on the islands, including the endangered southern giant-petrel and the wandering albatross, both threatened by long-line fishing.

The following tags have been used to highlight several categories. The commonly occurring native species do not fall into any of these categories.

 (A) Accidental - a species that rarely or accidentally occurs in Heard and McDonald Islands
 (E) Endemic - a species endemic to Heard and McDonald Islands

Sheathbills
Order: CharadriiformesFamily: Chionididae

The sheathbills are scavengers of the Antarctic regions. They have white plumage and look plump and dove-like but are believed to be similar to the ancestors of the modern gulls and terns.

Black-faced sheathbill, Chionis minor

Skuas and jaegers
Order: CharadriiformesFamily: Stercorariidae

The family Stercorariidae are, in general, medium to large birds, typically with grey or brown plumage, often with white markings on the wings. They nest on the ground in temperate and arctic regions and are long-distance migrants.

South polar skua, Stercorarius maccormicki (A)
Brown skua, Stercorarius antarctica

Gulls, terns, and skimmers
Order: CharadriiformesFamily: Laridae

Laridae is a family of medium to large seabirds, the gulls, terns, and skimmers. Gulls are typically grey or white, often with black markings on the head or wings. They have stout, longish bills and webbed feet. Terns are a group of generally medium to large seabirds typically with grey or white plumage, often with black markings on the head. Most terns hunt fish by diving but some pick insects off the surface of fresh water. Terns are generally long-lived birds, with several species known to live in excess of 30 years.

Kelp gull, Larus dominicanus
Arctic tern, Sterna paradisaea
Antarctic tern, Sterna vittata

Penguins
Order: SphenisciformesFamily: Spheniscidae

The penguins are a group of aquatic, flightless birds living almost exclusively in the Southern Hemisphere. Most penguins feed on krill, fish, squid and other forms of sealife caught while swimming underwater.

King penguin, Aptenodytes patagonicus
Emperor penguin, Aptenodytes forsteri 
Adelie penguin, Pygoscelis adeliae
Gentoo penguin, Pygoscelis papua
Chinstrap penguin, Pygoscelis antarctica
Macaroni penguin, Eudyptes chrysolophus
Southern rockhopper penguin, Eudyptes chrysocome

Albatrosses
Order: ProcellariiformesFamily: Diomedeidae

The albatrosses are among the largest of flying birds, and the great albatrosses from the genus Diomedea have the largest wingspans of any extant birds.

Yellow-nosed albatross, Thalassarche chlororhynchos (A) 
Gray-headed albatross, Thalassarche chrysostoma (A)
Black-browed albatross, Thalassarche melanophris
Sooty albatross, Phoebetria fusca (A)
Light-mantled albatross, Phoebetria palpebrata
Royal albatross, Diomedea epomophora (A)
Wandering albatross, Diomedea exulans

Southern storm-petrels
Order: ProcellariiformesFamily: Oceanitidae

The southern storm-petrels are relatives of the petrels and are the smallest seabirds. They feed on planktonic crustaceans and small fish picked from the surface, typically while hovering. The flight is fluttering and sometimes bat-like.

Wilson's storm-petrel, Oceanites oceanicus
Gray-backed storm-petrel, Garrodia nereis
Black-bellied storm-petrel, Fregetta tropica (A)

Shearwaters and petrels
Order: ProcellariiformesFamily: Procellariidae

The procellariids are the main group of medium-sized "true petrels", characterised by united nostrils with medium septum and a long outer functional primary.

Southern giant-petrel, Macronectes giganteus
Northern giant-petrel, Macronectes halli (A)
Southern fulmar, Fulmarus glacialoides
Antarctic petrel, Thalassoica antarctica
Cape petrel, Daption capense
Snow petrel, Pagodroma nivea
Kerguelen petrel, Aphrodroma brevirostris(A) 
Soft-plumaged petrel, Pterodroma mollis (A)
White-headed petrel, Pterodroma lessonii (A)
Mottled petrel, Pterodroma inexpectata  (A)
Blue petrel, Halobaena caerulea (A)
Fairy prion, Pachyptila turtur
Broad-billed prion, Pachyptila vittata (A)
Salvin's prion, Pachyptila salvini
Antarctic prion, Pachyptila desolata
Slender-billed prion, Pachyptila belcheri (A)
Fulmar prion, Pachyptila crassirostris
Gray petrel, Procellaria cinerea (A)
White-chinned petrel, Procellaria aequinoctialis (A)
Sooty shearwater, Ardenna grisea
Common diving-petrel, Pelecanoides urinatrix
South Georgia diving-petrel, Pelecanoides georgicus

Cormorants and shags
Order: SuliformesFamily: Phalacrocoracidae

Phalacrocoracidae is a family of medium to large coastal, fish-eating seabirds that includes cormorants and shags. Plumage colouration varies, with the majority having mainly dark plumage, some species being black-and-white and a few being colourful.

Imperial cormorant, Leucocarbo atriceps
Heard Island shag, Leucocarbo nivalis (E)

See also
Heard and McDonald Islands Important Bird Area
List of birds
Lists of birds by region

References

 Barrett, Geoff; Silcocks, Andrew; Barry, Simon; Cunningham, Ross; & Poulter, Rory (2003). The New Atlas of Australian Birds. Melbourne: Royal Australasian Ornithologists Union. 
 Birding-Aus Mailing List Archives
 Marchant, S.; Higgins. (Eds). (1990). Handbook of Australian, New Zealand and Antarctic Birds. Volume 1: Ratites to Ducks. Oxford University Press: Melbourne. 
 Marchant, S.; Higgins, P.J.; & Davies, J.N. (eds). (1994). Handbook of Australian, New Zealand and Antarctic Birds. Volume 2: Raptors to Lapwings. Oxford University Press: Melbourne. 
 Woehler, E.J. (1991). Status and conservation of the seabirds of Heard Island and the McDonald Islands. In: Croxall, J.P. (ed.), Seabird Status and Conservation: A Supplement. ICBP Technical Publication No. 11. International Council for Bird Preservation, Cambridge.
 Woehler, E.J. (2006) Status and conservation of the seabirds of Heard Island and the McDonald Islands. In: Green, K. & Woehler, E.J. (eds) Heard Island, Southern Ocean Sentinel. Surrey Beatty & Sons, Chipping Norton, Australia, pp 128–165.

 
Heard Island
Heard